Kozel may refer to:

Kozel (surname)
 Kozel Castle, near Plzeň, Czech Republic
 Kozel, a village in Albania

Other uses 
 Velkopopovický Kozel, a Czech lager beer produced since 1874